The Rose Bowl Story is a 1952 American romance film directed by William Beaudine and starring Marshall Thompson, Vera Miles and Richard Rober, featuring a young Natalie Wood. The film was made in Cinecolor. It follows the relationship between a college football player and his girlfriend.

Plot
Qualifying to play in the illustrious Rose Bowl football game on New Year's Day, a Midwestern college's quarterback, Steve Davis, is not as happy as he should be because playing football does not excite him, but his teammate Bronc Buttram is thrilled. Their coach, Jim Hadley, is equally pleased because his ill wife has gone to warmer Glendale, California for her health, so he will now be able to spend more time with her.

Steve perks up in Pasadena while meeting the Rose Bowl's committee and particularly the tournament's queen, Denny Burke, a beauty in a fur coat. Steve believes she is  wealthy as well as beautiful and manages to get her telephone number. He cannot get through, however, because Denny's younger sister Sally is always tying up the phone.

Finding her house, Steve learns she is  a middle-class girl whose dad, "Iron Mike" Burke, once played in a Rose Bowl game himself. Denny takes exception to Steve's disappointment that she is  not rich and to his blasé attitude toward the Rose Bowl, a tradition her family loves. The self-involved Steve develops a guilty conscience.

Agreeing to spend New Year's Eve with her family, Steve stands up Denny because he is at the hospital, where Coach Hadley's wife has taken a turn for the worse. He gets busy signals phoning because Sally's hogging it again. Next morning, Bronc explains to Denny and she is relieved. At the game, the coach announces his wife's going to be all right. Steve leads the team to victory, unselfishly letting Bronc score the winning touchdown. He and Denny are in love and plan to marry.

Cast
 Marshall Thompson as Steve Davis 
 Vera Miles as Denny Burke 
 Richard Rober as Coach James Hadley 
 Natalie Wood as Sally Burke 
 Keith Larsen as Bronc Buttram 
 Tom Harmon as himself 
 Ann Doran as Mrs. Addie Burke 
 James Dobson as Allie Bassler 
 Jim Backus as Michael 'Iron Mike' Burke 
 Clarence Kolb as 'Gramps' Burke 
 Barbara Woodell as Mrs. Mary Hadley 
 Bill Welsh as himself

References

Bibliography
 Marshall, Wendy L. William Beaudine: From Silents to Television. Scarecrow Press, 2005.
 Umphlett, Wiley Lee. The Movies Go to College: Hollywood and the World of the College-life Film. Fairleigh Dickinson Univ Press, 1984.

External links

1952 films
1952 romantic comedy films
American football films
American romantic comedy films
Cinecolor films
1950s English-language films
Films directed by William Beaudine
Films produced by Walter Mirisch
Films set in universities and colleges
Monogram Pictures films
Films set around New Year
1950s American films